This was the first edition of the event.

Ilie Năstase and Tom Okker won the title, defeating Mike Cahill and Colin Dibley 7–5, 6–4 in the final.

Seeds

  Ilie Năstase /  Tom Okker (champions)
  Mike Cahill /  Colin Dibley (final)
  John Feaver /  Frew McMillan (semifinals)
  Robin Drysdale /  Richard Lewis (quarterfinals)

Draw

Draw

External links
Draw

Tel Aviv Open
1979 Grand Prix (tennis)